National Highway 127B, commonly called NH 127B is a National Highway in North East India that connects Srirampur in Assam to Nongston in Meghalaya.

Route 
Srimrampur – Dhuburi - Phulbari - Tura - Rongram - Ronjeng - Nongston.

Junctions 

 Terminal with National Highway 15 near Srimrampur.
 Junction with National Highway 17 near Gauripur
 Junction with National Highway 217 near Tura
 Terminal with National Highway 215 near Nongston.

Geography 
Major portion of NH-127B, over 300 km lies in state of Meghalaya. This highway passes through four districts, namely, West Garo, South West Garo, East Garo and West Khasi Hills of Meghalaya. The alignment of the road in Meghalaya starts initially from rolling terrain and then major portion passes mainly through a hilly terrain and the road has to cross numerous rivers and streams.

See also 
 List of National Highways in India by highway number
 List of National Highways in India by state

References

External links
NH 127B on OpenStreetMap

National highways in India
National Highways in Assam
National Highways in Meghalaya